Americruiser is the second album by American alternative rock group Urge Overkill, released in 1990.

Critical reception
Trouser Press wrote: "Butch Vig’s production of Americruiser ... cleans the sound up enough to reveal the thin strings, clunky tempos and weak hooks holding the songs together." Spin called the album "relentlessly hard and fast, but ...  never murky." The Rough Guide to Rock wrote that "the songs had improved ... perhaps because they seemed less desperate to impress as comic narratives."

Track listing
All songs written by Nash Kato and Eddie "King" Roeser. 
"Ticket to L.A." – 2:16
"Blow Chopper" – 3:11
"76 Ball" – 2:59
"Empire Builder" – 4:11
"Faroutski" – 3:20
"Viceroyce" – 2:59
"Out on the Airstrip" – 4:08
"Smoke House" – 3:49

Personnel
Eddie "King" Roeser – lead vocals, bass guitar, guitars
Nash Kato – guitars, vocals (lead: tracks 4 and 7)
Jack "Jaguar" Watt – drums

References

Urge Overkill albums
1990 albums
Albums produced by Butch Vig
Touch and Go Records albums